The 1971 Maryville 200 was a NASCAR Winston Cup Series event that took place on April 15, 1971, at Smoky Mountain Raceway in Maryville, Tennessee.

Race report
Richard Petty defeated Benny Parsons by a time of eight seconds; Parsons' second-place finish came a week after coming up short at Columbia. These were his second and third runner-up finishes in NASCAR, but he'd finally break through with his first career win a month later in South Boston. Friday Hassler received the pole position with a speed of  while qualifying on the  speedway. There was only one caution, which lasted for three laps. D. K. Ulrich ran his first Cup Series race here while E.J. Trivette retired from NASCAR after this race.

Smoky Mountain Raceway closed forever after this race due to the changes in the sport during the Winston Cup era that aimed to modernize it. Abbreviation of the Cup Series schedule was the order of the day in the 1970s as the new sponsors wanted NASCAR to have a schedule that was structured closer to that of the National Football League.

Richard Petty won $1,000 for winning the race, the 125th win in his NASCAR Cup Series career. Notable crew chiefs for this race included Dale Inman, Vic Ballard, Lee Gordon and Mario Rossi.

The race car drivers still had to commute to the races using the same stock cars that competed in a typical weekend's race through a policy of homologation (and under their own power). This policy was in effect until roughly 1975. By 1980, NASCAR had completely stopped tracking the year model of all the vehicles and most teams did not take stock cars to the track under their own power anymore.

Qualifying

Finishing order
Section reference: 

 43-Richard Petty
 72-Benny Parsons†
 39-Friday Hassler†
 64-Elmo Langley†
 22-Dick Brooks†
 48-James Hylton†
 38-Charlie Glotzbach
 49-G.C. Spencer†
 24-Cecil Gordon†
 10-Bill Champion†
 19-Henley Gray
 30-Walter Ballard
 25-Jabe Thomas
 79-Frank Warren
 7-Dean Dalton
 28-Bill Hollar*†
 70-Bill Seifert*
 26-J.D. McDuffie*†
 26-Earl Brooks*
 67-Dick May*
 2-Dave Marcis*
 58-Robert Brown*
 4-John Sears*†
 34-Wendell Scott*†
 56-E.J. Trivette*
 06-Neil Castles*
 8-Ed Negre*
 74-Bill Shirey*
 41-D. K. Ulrich*
 02-Jimmy Crawford*†

* Driver failed to finish race 
† signifies that the driver is known to be deceased

References

Maryville 200
Maryville 200
NASCAR races at Smoky Mountain Raceway